Grabovica, Žepče is a village in the municipality of Žepče, Bosnia and Herzegovina.

History 
Prior to 2001 village was in Maglaj municipality.

Demographics 
According to the 2013 census, its population was 396, all Croats.

References

Populated places in Žepče